David Hans Bennett (born November 7, 1945) is an American former professional baseball right-handed pitcher. He had a 12-year pro career (1963–1974), but appeared in only one Major League Baseball (MLB) game, as a member of the  Philadelphia Phillies.

Bennett worked just one inning — the ninth — in relief, on June 12, against the New York Mets at Connie Mack Stadium. He allowed a leadoff triple to Joe Christopher, then wild pitched him home. Bennett later allowed a double to veteran Mets' shortstop Roy McMillan, who was left stranded. Bennett struck out Charley Smith and issued no bases on balls. The game, won by the Mets 11–3, had been started by Dave Bennett's older brother and teammate, Dennis, who took the loss.

Early life
Bennet attended Yreka High School and in 1963 he was signed by the Philadelphia Phillies as an undrafted free agent (prior to the establishment of the Major League Draft).

Minor league career
Bennett pitched in the Phillies' farm system for seven years,  before being dealt to the Pittsburgh Pirates organization (with minor leaguer Mike Everett) for catcher Del Bates, on January 28, 1970.

See also
Philadelphia Phillies all-time roster

References

External links

Dave Bennett at SABR (Baseball BioProject)
Dave Bennett at Baseball Almanac

1945 births
Living people
Arkansas Travelers players
Bakersfield Bears players
Baseball players from Berkeley, California
Charleston Charlies players
Chattanooga Lookouts players
Eugene Emeralds players
Macon Peaches players
Major League Baseball pitchers
People from Yreka, California
Philadelphia Phillies players
Reading Phillies players
Salem Pirates players
Sherbrooke Pirates players
Thetford Mines Pirates players
Tidewater Tides players
Waterbury Pirates players
Yreka High School alumni